David Hou or Hou Hai-hsiung (born 1943) is a Taiwanese politician.

Hou was elected to the Legislative Yuan in 1992 via party list proportional representation, as a member of the Democratic Progressive Party, and assumed office on 1 February 1993. He became the first sitting lawmaker affiliated with the DPP to be expelled from the party, and was replaced as a legislator by Chiang Peng-chien.

References

1943 births
Living people
Members of the 2nd Legislative Yuan
Party List Members of the Legislative Yuan
Democratic Progressive Party Members of the Legislative Yuan
Expelled members of the Democratic Progressive Party (Taiwan)